Planet Patrol is an American electro group originating in the 1980s. The members were Arthur Baker, John Robie, and a quintet of vocalists led by Herbert J. Jackson (lead singer), Joseph Lites, Rodney Butler, Michael Anthony Jones, and Melvin B. Franklin (not to be confused with Melvin Franklin of The Temptations). The group only produced a single album, the self-titled Planet Patrol in 1983, which peaked at #64 on the Billboard R&B Albums chart.

The group's most popular song, "Play at Your Own Risk", was created from tracks that did not make the final version of Afrika Bambaataa's seminal "Planet Rock".

Discography

Albums

Singles

References

External links
 Interview on BTS with Phillysnaps
 Therealplanetpatrol at Myspace
 Discogs site

American electro musicians
Musicians from New York City
Musical groups from Boston
Tommy Boy Records artists
American freestyle music groups